Aglossa dimidiatus is a species of snout moth in the genus Aglossa. It was described by Adrian Hardy Haworth in 1809 from London, Great Britain, but this is probably an accidental introduction. It is found in Gibraltar.

References

Moths described in 1809
Pyralini
Moths of Europe